Julia Lee (October 31, 1902 – December 8, 1958) was an American blues and dirty blues musician.

Biography
Born in Boonville, Missouri, Lee was raised in Kansas City, and began her musical career around 1920, singing and playing piano in her brother George Lee's band, which for a time also included Charlie Parker.  She first recorded on the Merritt record label in 1927 with Jesse Stone as pianist and arranger, and launched a solo career in 1935.

In 1944 she secured a recording contract with Capitol Records, and a string of R&B hits followed, including "Gotta Gimme Whatcha Got" (No. 3 R&B, 1946), "Snatch and Grab It" (No. 1 R&B for 12 weeks, 1947, selling over 500,000 copies), "King Size Papa" (No. 1 R&B for 9 weeks, 1948), "I Didn't Like It The First Time (The Spinach Song)" (No. 4 R&B, 1949), and "My Man Stands Out".

As these titles suggest, she became best known for her trademark double entendre songs, or, as she once said, "the songs my mother taught me not to sing".  The records were credited to 'Julia Lee and Her Boy Friends', her session musicians including Jay McShann, Vic Dickenson, Benny Carter, Red Norvo, Nappy Lamare, Red Nichols and Jack Marshall.

She was married to Frank Duncan, a star catcher and manager of the Negro National League's Kansas City Monarchs. He, like Julia, was a native of Kansas City.

Although her hits dried up after 1949, she continued as one of the most popular performers in Kansas City until her death in Kansas City, at the age of 56, from a heart attack.

References

External links

African American Registry

1902 births
1958 deaths
People from Boonville, Missouri
African-American pianists
American blues singers
American blues pianists
Dirty blues musicians
Jump blues musicians
Singers from Missouri
Capitol Records artists
Classic female blues singers
20th-century American pianists
20th-century African-American women singers
20th-century women pianists